The Pennsylvania State Police (PSP) is the state police agency of the U.S. state of Pennsylvania, responsible for statewide law enforcement. The Pennsylvania State Police is a full service law enforcement agency which handles both traffic and criminal law enforcement. The Pennsylvania State Police was founded in 1905 by order of Governor Samuel Pennypacker, by signing Senate Bill 278 on May 2, 1905. The bill was signed in response to the Great Anthracite Strike of 1902. Leading up to the Anthracite Strike, private police forces (the coal and iron police) were used by mine and mill owners to stop worker strikes. The inability or refusal of local police or sheriffs' offices to enforce the law, directly influenced the signing of Bill 278. The Anthracite Strike lasted from May 15 to October 23, 1902, and ended with the help of Theodore Roosevelt, the sitting president at the time. Roosevelt was outspoken in his admiration for the Pennsylvania State Police, having this to say, "The Pennsylvania State Police are a spirited force not to be bought, bent, confused, alarmed or exhausted", and "I feel so strongly about them that the mere fact a man is honorably discharged from this force would make me at once, and without hesitation, employ him for any purpose needing courage, prowess, good judgment, loyalty, and entire trustworthiness."

PSP enlisted members are referred to as "Troopers". Up until 1963, married men were not allowed to apply to the state police, and active troopers had to seek permission from their superior officer to get married. As of 2018, the state police has approximately 4,255 state troopers, 5% of them being women, and more than 1,850 civilian support staff.

Pennsylvania State Police Academy
In 1924, a State Police training academy was built in Hershey, Pennsylvania, on Cocoa Avenue. The site was located at the Hershey Inn and it remained at this location until 1960 when it was moved to 175 Hersheypark Drive, Hershey, Pennsylvania. The current location is fitted with kennels, stables and a range, among other facilities, and is located only a few miles from the original site. Once accepted into the Pennsylvania State Police Academy cadets endure a rigorous 28-week training period. Cadets live at the academy in barracks style quarters and are only permitted to go home on designated weekends. Cadets who fail to complete physical training in required times or who show any other type of deficiencies may be restricted from going home. While attending training, cadets are put on an 18-month probationary period and can be dismissed at any point in their training by the commissioner under any form of incompetence, inefficiency, or general violation of rules and regulations. The current drop-out rate for new recruits in the academy is approximately 20 percent per class.

Facilities
The PSP owns and operates a myriad of facilities to conduct law enforcement operations across the Commonwealth. The following is the breakdown:

Troops

Troop A, Area II
 Cambria, Indiana, Somerset, Westmoreland Counties; Troop HQ – Greensburg

Troop B, Area I
 Allegheny, Fayette, Greene, Washington Counties; Troop HQ – Washington

Troop C, Area I
 Clarion, Clearfield, Elk, Forest, Jefferson, McKean Counties; Troop HQ – Punxsutawney

Troop D, Area I
 Armstrong, Beaver, Butler, Lawrence, Mercer Counties; Troop HQ – Butler

Troop E, Area I
 Crawford, Erie, Venango, Warren Counties; Troop HQ – Erie (Located in Lawrence Park)

Troop F, Area III
 Cameron, Clinton, Lycoming, Montour, Northumberland, Potter, Snyder, Tioga,
Union Counties; Troop HQ – Montoursville

Troop G, Area II
 Bedford, Blair, Centre, Fulton, Huntingdon, Juniata, Mifflin Counties; Troop HQ – Hollidaysburg

Troop H, Area II
 Adams, Cumberland, Dauphin, Franklin, and Perry Counties; Troop and *Department HQ – Harrisburg

Troop J, Area IV
 Chester, York and Lancaster Counties; Troop HQ – Lancaster

Troop K, Area IV
 Delaware, Montgomery, Philadelphia Counties; Troop HQ – Philadelphia

Troop L, Area IV
 Berks, Lebanon, Schuylkill Counties; Troop HQ – Reading

Troop M, Area IV
 Bucks, Lehigh, Northampton Counties; Troop HQ – Bethlehem

Troop N, Area III
 Carbon, Columbia, Lower Luzerne, Monroe Counties; Troop HQ – Hazleton

Troop P, Area III
 Bradford, Upper Luzerne, Sullivan, Wyoming Counties; Troop HQ – Wilkes-Barre

Troop R, Area III
 Lackawanna, Pike, Susquehanna, Wayne Counties; Troop HQ – Dunmore

Troop T
 Turnpike; Troop HQ – Penna. Turnpike Commission HQ, Highspire

Barracks listing by county

Bureaus and offices
The PSP also has many bureaus and subdivisions within the organization.
This is by no means a complete list, merely a sampling of the breakdown.
 Bureau of Criminal Investigation
 Bureau of Emergency and Special Operations
 Bureau of Forensic Services
 Bureau of Human Resources
 Bureau of Liquor Control Enforcement
 Bureau of Records and Identification
 Bureau of Patrol
 Bureau of Integrity and Professional Standards
 Bureau of Communications and Information Services
 Bureau of Staff Services
 Bureau of Research & Development
 Bureau of Training & Education
 Bureau of Gaming Enforcement
 Commonwealth Law Enforcement Assistance Network – C.L.E.A.N.
 Equal Employment Opportunity Office
 Public Information Office
 Recruitment and Special Services Office
 Member Assistance Office
 Department Discipline Office
 Municipal Police Officers' Education and Training Commission (MPOETC)
 Domestic Security Office

Units
 Uniform Patrol Units
 Criminal Investigation Units
 Vice/Narcotics
 Organized Crime
 Intelligence Units
 Unsolved Crimes 
 Fugitive Units
 Marine Unit
 Aviation
 Motorcycle Units
 K-9 Units    
 Collision Analysis and Reconstruction Specialists
 Vehicle Fraud Investigation
 Mounted Units
 Commercial Vehicle Enforcement  
 Auto Theft Units
 Firearms Instructors
 Public Information Officers
 Recruiting Unit
 Community Service Officer
 Forensic Services Unit
 Gaming Enforcement
 Computer Crimes   
 PA Crime Stoppers
 PA Criminal Intelligence Center
 Fire Marshals
 Polygraph Unit
 Megan's Law Unit
 Ceremonial Unit
 PA Instant Check System
 Interdiction Units
 Ballistics Section 
 Clandestine Lab Units   
 State Police Crime Laboratories   
 Explosives/Bomb Section
 Academy Instructors    
 Drug Recognition Experts
 Criminal Interdiction (S.H.I.E.L.D)
 Special Emergency Response Teams (SERT), which is the PA State Police’s version of S.W.A.T
 Negotiators

Uniform and rank structure

The uniform worn by PSP troopers is unique within Pennsylvania. In January 1988, the State Police changed the color of its uniforms. PSP troopers wore dark grey uniforms that confused them with some municipal police departments and Pennsylvania State Constables. By state law, no municipal (city, borough, or township) police department can wear the same exact uniform or color configuration as that of the PSP.

Uniform – troopers to sergeants

The current PSP uniform for troopers, corporals, and sergeants consists of a light gray uniform shirt with black shoulder epaulets. The PSP shoulder patch is worn on both sleeves of all uniform items. The PSP members are issued long sleeve shirts for the winter and short sleeve shirts for summer. However, PSP requires the black necktie to be worn year round. The uniform shirt consist of the trooper's nameplate over the right pocket and any awards the trooper has earned over the left pocket. The PSP is one of only five state police forces that do not wear a badge on their uniform shirts. The original PSP uniform was modeled after the Constabulary forces in Europe and they did not have badges. It is history and tradition for troopers today to carry their badges in a wallet along with their photo ID card. The uniform trousers are a darker gray color with a one-inch-wide black stripe on the leg. PSP shoes and/or boots are also black in color.

The PSP duty belt is plain black leather. The duty holster is the level-2 model. The ammo pouch and handcuff case have hidden snap closure. The OC pepper spray and ASP baton holders are open top. The duty belt is held together with the trousers belt using four silver snap belt keepers.

The PSP trademark item is the campaign-style hat with the chin strap worn in the front under the chin on the winter campaign hat (as opposed to most agencies that wear the strap of the campaign hat behind the head). The hat contains a blackened commonwealth coat of arms. It is required to be worn whenever the trooper is outdoors. It is made of dark gray felt (for wintertime wear) or light gray straw (for summertime wear). The strap of the summer hat is worn behind the head.

The Class "A" Ceremonial Unit troopers wear a "full dress" uniform which is a charcoal gray military-style dress coat with black buttons. It is worn with matching charcoal gray military-style riding breeches and black high-rider leather boots. The duty belt is worn with the shoulder strap. This uniform is modeled after the original PSP history uniform.

Uniform – lieutenants to colonels

The uniforms for PSP Lieutenants, Captains, Majors, Lieutenant Colonels, and the Colonel are identical to that of the lower ranks, except for the following:
 A gold-colored commonwealth coat of arms on the left collar and the officer's rank on the right collar.
 Black stripes on trousers has a gold stripe within it of increasing width with higher rank.
 The campaign hat is replaced with a military officer's style service cap with a gold-colored commonwealth seal. Captains and above have the distinctive "scrambled eggs" on the visor. Alternatively, officers may wear the campaign hat with a gold coat of arms with the duty uniform.

In addition to the minor detail changes, senior officers wear the four-button military coat for "Class A" functions. The coat has four gold-colored buttons, breast and hip pockets, and shoulder epaulets for the placement of the officer's current rank. A white shirt is worn with a black tie underneath. A system of "rank rings" are worn on each sleeve, similar to the rank-ring system used by the U.S. Navy, U.S. Coast Guard, and by land units of the Canadian Forces. Currently, the insignia worn by PSP senior officers are as follows:
 Lieutenant: no service stripes
 Captain: one service stripe
 Major: two service stripes
 Lieutenant Colonel: three service stripes
 Colonel: four service stripes

Ranks, insignia, and descriptions, Etc

Vehicles
The department currently operates a mixed fleet of vehicles including the new law enforcement specific Ford Taurus, Ford Explorer, Crown Victorias and Dodge Charger, which are only used by Pennsylvania Turnpike Troopers. The PSP also owns and operates numerous helicopters and fixed wing aircraft. PSP operates watercraft mainly on the Delaware River and Lake Erie.

Aviation
     
The PSP Aviation Section consists of thirty-five trooper pilots and three full-time mechanics, using eight law enforcement specific Bell 407GX helicopters and six airplanes statewide. These aircraft are stationed in six aviation patrol units (APU).

Weapons
The Pennsylvania State Police utilizes the SIG Sauer P227 semiautomatic pistol chambered in .45 ACP as their service pistol.

Other firearms include the Colt AR-15 (including the LE6920 and LE6940), 12-gauge shotguns (including the Remington 870 pump), and gas grenade launcher.

The current less-lethal weapons the PSP is utilizing consist of Electroshock weapon technology, pepper spray (OC), and expandable ASP straight batons.

Accreditation

The Pennsylvania State Police is the largest internationally accredited law enforcement agency in the world. This distinction was awarded to the Pennsylvania State Police on July 31, 1993, by the Commission on Accreditation for Law Enforcement Agencies (CALEA), an independent, non-profit organization based in Fairfax, Virginia.

Accreditation is a process used by professional law enforcement agencies to facilitate the creation, verification and maintenance of high-quality policies and procedures, via voluntary compliance with performance standards. CALEA's 446 standards address nine major law enforcement topics: role, responsibilities, and relationships with other agencies; organization, management, and administration; personnel structure; personnel process; operations; operational support; traffic operations; prisoner and court-related services; and auxiliary and technical services.

Members killed in the line of duty
Key

Superintendents and Commissioners since 1905
The following is a chronological listings of Commissioners of the Pennsylvania State Police:

Traditions

 PSP Troopers are widely recognized for wearing the strap of their winter campaign hats under their chins, a tradition that goes back to the early 1900s, which was based on British and Irish Bobbies.
 The PSP is one of only a handful of state police agencies that do not wear badges on their uniforms.
 The PSP was nationally recognized as the premiere state police agency in the early years of the 20th century. State troopers from North Carolina and Kentucky attended the training academy so they could start PSP-style state agencies in their respective states. NC trooper cadets at the academy in Raleigh and KY trooper cadets in Frankfort are frequently reminded they have a familial connection to the PSP through their training process history.
 The PSP was patterned after a military organization and PSP troopers have sometimes been referred to as "Soldiers of the Law and Order". Divisions of the force are called "troops", and officers are known as "troopers", a title usually reserved for members of the United States Cavalry, and reminiscent of the early beginnings of the department when officers patrolled on horseback. Regional headquarters, at which single troopers were once required to live, are referred to as "barracks". The original concept was that the troopers did not apply to join the PSP but "enlisted" for two-year periods, after which they could be honorably discharged or apply for reenlistment. The longstanding two-year enlistment periods were phased out in 1961.
 Married men were initially barred from becoming state troopers. After 1927, troopers were allowed to marry after they had completed their first two-year enlistment if they had approval from the police superintendent. The PSP allowed married men to enlist in 1963.
 PSP does not allow ride-alongs. Even state police cadets cannot "ride along" prior to graduating the academy. This is done for numerous safety and liability reasons.

Misconduct and controversy

 2000
Trooper Michael Evans pleaded guilty in October 2000 to sexual crimes committed against six women and teenage girls while on duty. He was sentenced to between five and ten years in custody.

2007
In September, 2007, Trooper Kevin Foley was arrested for the murder of a dentist, Dr. John Yelenic, in Blairsville, Pennsylvania.

 2008
In July, 2008, Trooper Kevin Coleman was charged with protecting a prostitution ring based out of the Gables Truck Stop in Harrisburg, Pennsylvania.

 2009
In May 2009, Trooper Shawn Dillard was found guilty by a federal court of using his position to protect an interstate prostitution ring based out of the Gables Truck Stop in Harrisburg, Pennsylvania. This was the same investigation that led to the arrest of Trooper Coleman.

 2011
In early 2011, as a result of a lawsuit brought by the American Civil Liberties Union, the state police agreed to stop issuing tickets to people who swear. Press reports indicated the state police had issued as many as 700 such citations a year.

 2012
In January 2012, Lieutenant Barry Eugene Staub, the commander of the state police barracks in York was arrested for driving while drunk. He retired when charges were brought against him.

 2014
In March, 2014 Trooper Barry M Seafoss, Jr. pleaded guilty to killing a woman while driving drunk in 2012. He was sentenced to between six and 23 months' confinement.

 2017
Trooper Ryan Luckenbaugh was sentenced by Judge Scott A. Evans to 9 to 22 months in county prison on his official oppression, simple assault and harassment convictions. Luckenbaugh kicked a handcuffed man in the face while the man sat on the sidewalk and lied about it on official reports.

2021
Trooper Robert E. Covington Jr., of Olyphant, PA, for his alleged involvement in illegal activity occurring at Sinners Swing Gentlemen's Club in Mayfield Borough, Lackawanna County. Covington, 48, is a 13-year veteran of PSP and was assigned to the Bureau of Gaming Enforcement, Pocono Downs Wilkes-Barre Office. He had been on restricted duty during the investigation and is currently suspended without pay pending resolution of the charges against him.

Multiple Troopers Facing Charges

2022
Trooper Joshua Ravel from the York barracks was charged with DUI while on duty after he showed up for his shift and drove from York to Lancaster and back for a special assignment. He was taken to the supervisors office where he appeared under the influence, and a chemical breath test revealed his blood alcohol content to be .144. A review of the dash camera footage from his cruiser showed he was unable to maintain his lane of travel several times during the drive.

Trooper Joshua Burney from the Lewis Run barracks in McKean county was charged with DUI while on duty after a colleague noticed he smelled of alcohol and had red, glossed over eyes. Trooper Burney was taken back to the barracks where preliminary field sobriety tests and a breath test showed signs of impairment. A blood draw test showed his blood alcohol content to be .086. A review of the dash camera footage from his cruiser showed he was unable to maintain his lane of travel several times during his response to an emergency call in Mount Jewett Borough.

Both troopers were suspended without pay pending to outcome of their cases. Trooper Burney was the second trooper to be charged with DUI on duty within 4 months along with Trooper Ravel. Both were on the job for the PA State Police for less then 2 years. Trooper Ravel graduated from the Academy in June 2020, and Trooper Burney graduated August 2021.

In popular culture
 H. Beam Piper's 1965 science fiction novel Lord Kalvan of Otherwhens eponymous character begins the story as a PSP Trooper.
 An undercover PSP Trooper played by Sarah Jessica Parker co-stars with Bruce Willis playing a Pittsburgh Police River Rescue Squad officer in the 1993 movie Striking Distance.
 A PSP Trooper is played by Harland Williams in the 1994 film Dumb and Dumber.
 The PSP were featured in the sixth-season CSI: NY episode "Redemptio" as well as the ninth-season Law & Order episode titled "Hate".
 The PSP is featured in the 2004 TV film Boa vs. Python.
 Featured in the 1997 movie For Richer or Poorer.
 Stephen King's novel From a Buick 8 features Troop D in a fictional town named Statler.
 The PSP were featured in the 2010 movie Unstoppable, in which a runaway train passes through numerous townships within the state of Pennsylvania.
 Multiple PSP troopers and the department were featured in the Netflix series Evil Genius, which covered the murder of Brian Wells and the bank heist surrounding it.
 PSP Criminal Investigators were featured in the first-season episode of TV series Cold Case Files, titled "Little Girl Lost".
 PSP featured extensively, including fairly accurate depictions of uniforms and vehicles, in the film Angel Has Fallen.

See also

 List of law enforcement agencies in Pennsylvania
 List of Pennsylvania state agencies
 Pennsylvania Capitol Police
 Highway patrol
 State patrol
 State police

References

External links
 ODMP memorial for Pennsylvania State Police
 Official Web Site
 Official Recruiting Web Site
 Pennsylvania State Police History
 Pennsylvania State Troopers Association
 Retired State Police Association of Pennsylvania
 Law Enforcement Management and Administrative Statistics, 2000: Data for Individual State and Local Agencies with 100 or More Officers
 PA Troops Directory 
 "PA State Police Training Academy"
 "United States Department of Labor"
 "PA Trooper History"
 "The Greatest Strike Ever"
 "How to Become a Police Officer"

 
State law enforcement agencies of Pennsylvania
Government agencies established in 1905
1905 establishments in Pennsylvania